Gheorghe Georgescu may refer to:

 (1857–1944), Romanian general who served in World War I
Gheorghe Georgescu (footballer) (1911–?), Romanian forward footballer